The Heinkel He 74 was a light fighter aircraft developed in Germany in the early 1930s. It was a conventional, single-bay biplane with staggered, unequal-span wings braced with an I-type interplane strut. The pilot sat in an open cockpit, and the undercarriage was of the fixed, tailskid type.

It was designed in response to a RLM requirement for a Heimatschutzjäger - a light fighter aircraft suitable for purely defensive duties and which would have a secondary role as an advanced trainer for fighter pilots. Although it was not strictly a requirement of the specification, firms submitting designs were urged to use a monoplane layout.

During trials in 1934, the He 74 outperformed its competitors, but in the end, the RLM awarded it third place, behind the Focke-Wulf Fw 56 and Arado Ar 76, believing that since the fighters then being developed were all monoplanes, this configuration was essential for an advanced trainer as well.

Specifications

References

External links

Luftwaffe Resource Centre
He.74 (Russian)

1930s German military trainer aircraft
He 074
Single-engined tractor aircraft
Biplanes
Aircraft first flown in 1933